Fotbal Club Zimbru Chișinău, commonly known as Zimbru Chișinău or simply Zimbru, is a Moldovan professional football club based in Chișinău, which competes in the Moldovan Super Liga, the highest tier of Moldovan football.

Founded in the Moldavian Soviet Socialist Republic in 1947, Zimbru entered the Soviet Top League in 1956 and totalled eleven participations before their last relegation in 1983. After the independence of Moldova in 1991, the team established itself as an early force in the country, winning all the first five national titles and eight of the first nine, but have not won since. Zimbru's honours also include six Moldovan Cups and one Moldovan Super Cup.

Zimbru play their home matches at the 10,400-seater Zimbru Stadium.

History

Zimbru Chișinău was formed in 1947 in the Moldovan Soviet Republic (present day Republic of Moldova). 'Zimbru' is a Romanian word for a form of European bison, but the club also previously functioned under names such as Dinamo, Burevestnik, Moldova, Avântul, and Nistru. The Soviet Era was spent mostly in Class B of the regional league until eventual promotion to Class A. The club then flitted between Class A and Class B as well as spending time in the Soviet Top League and First League. In total, Zimbru spent 11 seasons in the Top League between 1956 and 1983. Zimbru had their biggest success in 1956 when they finished in 6th place out of 12  in the Soviet Top League and in 1963 when they reached the quarter-finals of the Soviet Cup.

Zimbru's fortunes changed after the fall of the USSR and the establishment of the Republic of Moldova. The club won all five of the initial seasons of the Moldovan National Division (1992–96), and apart from finishing as runners-up to Chișinău rivals Constructorul Chișinău in 1996–97, won eight of the first nine championships. Zimbru have also won the Moldovan Cup six times, including a double in 1997–98 and the Moldovan Super Cup once.

Crest and colours
Since its foundation, Zimbru's colours always was yellow and green. Throughout history, Zimbru Chișinău had many logos. Traditional colours were always present on club crests.

Stadium

FC Zimbru's home ground is Zimbru Stadium, a football-specific stadium in Botanica sector of Chișinău. It was opened in 2006. The stadium has a natural grass playing surface, and its capacity is 10,400.

Rivalries
In the 1990s (the first decade of Moldova's independence), Zimbru's rival was the other team from Chișinău, Constructorul Chișinău. Then Contructorul was dissolved. In 1997, a new team was founded in Tiraspol, Sheriff Tiraspol. In a few years, Sheriff was promoted to the first league and became a force in Moldovan football. Considering the strength of team and the tensions between Moldovans and separatist Transnistrians, the match between Zimbru and Sheriff became a derby, the most important match in country. Thus, it has been named "Derby of Moldova", being labelled even as "Moldovan El Clasico".
Another rivalry was established in the mid 2000s when Dacia Chișinău, another team from Chișinău, became one of Moldova's top teams. The match between them is known as "The Derby of the capital".

Honours

Moldova
 Divizia Națională / Liga Națională / Superliga
 Winners (8): 1992, 1992–93, 1993–94, 1994–95, 1995–96, 1997–98, 1998–99, 1999–2000

 Runners-up (5): 1996–97, 2000–01, 2002–03, 2005–06, 2006–07

 Third place (4): 2001–02, 2003–04, 2011–12, 2015–16

 Cupa Moldovei
 Winners (6): 1996–97, 1997–98, 2002–03, 2003–04, 2006–07, 2013–14
 Runners-up (3): 1994–95, 1999–2000, 2017–18

 Supercupa Moldovei
 Winners (1): 2014
 Runners-up (3): 2003, 2004, 2007

Soviet Union
 Soviet First League
 Winners (1): 1955
 Runners-up (2): 1973, 1982

 Soviet Second League
 Winners (2): 1987, 1988

Players

Current squad

Player of the year
Zimbru players who received the award Moldovan Footballer of the Year:

League history

Table

European record

UEFA Champions League

UEFA Cup Winners' Cup

UEFA Cup

UEFA Europa League

Notes: PR – preliminary round. QR – qualifying round. R1 – First round. R2 – Second roundQ1, Q2, Q3 – qualifying rounds. PO – play-off round.

Club officials

Technical staff

As of 24 September 2022

Club management
As of 5 July 2021

Former players

Former managers

References

External links
 Official website 
 Profile at soccerway.com 
 Zimbru Chișinău  at weltfussballarchiv.com
 Zimbru Chișinău supporters website – ”OASTEA FIARĂ”
 Profile at footballfacts.ru 

 
Football clubs in Moldova
Football clubs in Chișinău
Association football clubs established in 1947
1947 establishments in the Moldavian Soviet Socialist Republic
Football clubs in the Moldavian Soviet Socialist Republic
Soviet Top League clubs